Just Another Nice Guy is an original Comedy Coming Of Age web television series created by Wong Fu Productions.  The series was launched on YouTube August 9, 2017.  The short follows "Derek" (Motoki Maxted) as he struggles to understand what being a "nice guy" really means.

Plot 
The story begins with Derek confessing his feelings to Audrey and being disappointed, confused, and slightly angry with her unexpected response.

We then get taken back to when Derek first realizes he is looked at as "just a nice guy" in the eyes of girls. Derek then watches "Just A Nice Guy" by Wong Fu Productions and decides to embrace the title of "nice guy" and prove that nice guys don't finish last.

Once Derek is rejected by Audrey and begins to question whether he really wants to be a "nice guy" or just be another "douche-bag", we follow along as his friends Julia and Lawrence try to help him through his heart-break and teach him that you should be true to yourself and not act a certain way just to get people to like you.

Cast and characters 
 Motoki Maxted as Derek
 Piper Curda as Audrey
 Krista Marie Yu as Julia
 Will Pacarro (aka YellowPaco) as Lawrence 
Philip Wang as himself
Megan Lee as Sandra
 Kelsey Impicciche as Kristin
 Simmi Singh as Sophie

Production 
Production for the series began on June 25, 2017.
On August 23, 2017 Wong Fu Productions held a finale screening of the series at the AMC Atlantic Square Theaters with a special Q & A with the crew after the screening and a booth to buy merchandise.
On September 25, 2017 Wong Fu Productions held another screening for the series in Honolulu, Hawaii at the Consolidated Theaters. The event sold out just a few days after tickets went on sale. The screening featured the "Just Another Nice Guy" series as well as other favorite shorts by Wong Fu Productions, with a Q & A after the event and a merchandise booth.

The series was met with praise for showing that just because you are a "nice guy" doesn't mean you can expect things in return. 
“Just Another Nice Guy” challenged the Nice Guy™ trope in ways that “Just A Nice Guy” didn’t.
"Just Another Nice Guy was Wong Fu’s way of expressing to the fans and the world that even though they were rejected, these bunch of nice guys and gals don’t finish last."

WRITTEN & DIRECTED by Philip Wang
PRODUCED by Ashley Matsunami and Benson Quach 
DIRECTOR OF PHOTOGRAPHY Christopher Yang 
EDITED by Taylor Chan and Philip Wang
EXECUTIVE PRODUCERS Wesley Chan and Philip Wang
MUSIC by Travis Atreo titled “Mercy” 
Assistant Director Benson Quach -
2nd Assistant Director Reed Hedani -
Assistant Camera Michelle Hsieh -
2nd Assistant Camera / BTS Camera Marisa Nagata -
Social Media/ BTS Camera Jennifer Le -
Key Grip Justin Lieu -
Hair and Make-up Andi Loc -
Production Assistants Hayley Matsumoto, Krista Lee, Jonathan Huynh, Matt Ergina, Jamie Tagomori -
Colorist Christopher Yang -
Title Design by Jennifer Le

Episodes

References 

2017 web series debuts
2017 web series endings